State Route 131 (SR 131, commonly called Woods Creek Road and Cispus Road) is a short  Washington state highway in Lewis County, extending from the northern terminus of  (FR 25) at the boundary of the Gifford Pinchot National Forest to  (US 12) in Randle.

Route description

From FR 25, the roadway travels northbound as Woods Creek Road to an intersection with Cispus Road, where it is renamed to the aforementioned street. Before the US 12 intersection in Randle, the road was used by a daily average of 1,700 motorists in 2007, making this segment the busiest along the route. The same intersection was also the busiest on SR 131 in 1992, only with a daily average of 3,100 motorists.

History

The first appearance of the current route on a map was in 1924, when a map of the area around Mount Rainier showed a road extending from Siler Creek to Randle. The highway then became SR 131 in 1991, when the Washington State Legislature revised the highway system.

Major intersections

References

External links
Highways of Washington State

131
Transportation in Lewis County, Washington